"Fuck Was I" is a song by Jenny Owen Youngs, from her 2005 album Batten the Hatches. Its name refers to the phrase "What the fuck was I thinking?"

Youngs wrote it "between (her) junior and senior years at SUNY Purchase". She is accompanied by Dan Romer (organ) and Patrick Petty (cello).

Reception
Spin called it a "stand-out" — an opinion shared by Autostraddle, who also called it a "stirring anthem for the regretful". MusicOMH considered it "rueful", while LA Weekly described it as an "antilove song" that evinces Youngs' "unexpectedly wicked sense of humor". Pop Matters described it as "attention-grabbing" and "charming at first", but faulted it for being "a little too self-conscious" with some lyrics that are "overwrought", judging that it was "an example of all that is both right and wrong with Batten the Hatches".

Track listings and formats
 CD single
 "Fuck Was I" (uncensored) – 3:32
 "Fuck Was I" (Morgan Page remix edit) – 3:49
 "Hot in Herre"  – 4:18
 "Fuck Was I" (Morgan Page remix) – 6:47

Credits and personnel
Credits and personnel are adapted from the Batten the Hatches album liner notes.
 Jenny Owen Youngs – vocals, writer
 Dan Romer – producer, engineering, mixing, arrangement, electric piano
 Andrew Futral – arrangement assistance
 Andrew Platt – bass
 Patrick Petty – cello
 Adam Christgau – drums
 Hawk – viola, voice
 Bob Pycior – violin
 Jay Newland – mastering

References

2005 songs
2007 singles
Nettwerk Records singles